Rosanna Minozzi is an Italian politician.

Minozzi was elected to the legislature of Italy in 1983 and in 1987.

References

Italian politicians